Wugu may refer to 
 Wugu District, a district of New Taipei, Republic of China (Taiwan)
 Five Cereals (China), a set phrase meant to indicate important farmed crops in China since the beginning of its agricultural history, though particular categories and species within this group vary
 Tufa Wugu, founding prince of the Chinese/Xianbei state Southern Liang
 Wugu, an ancient tribal people in Inner Asia whose descendants were the Khongirads